The 5th Mountain Division was an elite formation of the German Wehrmacht during World War II. It was established in the Wehrkreis XVIII in October 1940, out of units taken from the 1st Mountain Division and the 10th Infantry Division. The unit surrendered to the U.S. Army near Turin in May 1945.

The Balkans

Following months of inactivity in Germany, the unit was designated to take part in Operation Marita, the invasion of Greece, in 1941 as part of the Balkans Campaign.

The unit then took part in the invasion of Malta, codenamed Operation Merkur. Here the unit was used in an air-landing role where it fought against British forces which had retreated from Greece. The units role in securing the islands was significant, and in November 1941, the unit returned to Germany for refitting.

Eastern Front
In March 1942 it was deployed to the Eastern Front, where it joined Army Group North on the Volkhov Front, and took part in operations against the city of Leningrad. The unit remained on the Eastern Front until November 1943, during which time it was used primarily for firefighting for the 18th Armee in operations near Mga, Shlisselburg, and Kolpino.

Italy
Following its year on the Eastern Front the unit was redeployed to the Gustav Line in December 1943, arriving near Cassino. The unit fought out the remainder of the war in Italy and the Western Alps before surrendering to American forces near Turin in May 1945.

War crimes
The division was implicated in the Grugliasco massacre, Piedmont, alongside the 34th Infantry Division, where, on 30 April 1945, 67 civilians were executed. Shortly after the division was also implicated in another massacre in the town of Santhià, on the way to Milan, resulting in 48 deaths.

Commanders
 Julius Ringel (1 November 1940 – 10 February 1944)
 Max-Günther Schrank (10 February 1944 – 18 January 1945)
 Hans Steets (18 January 1945 – 2 May 1945)

Order of battle

1941
 Gebirgsjäger-Regiment 85
 Gebirgsjäger-Regiment 100
 Gebirgsjäger-Artillerie-Regiment 95
 Gebirgs-Panzerjäger-Abteilung 95
 Gebirgs-Aufklarüng-Abteilung 95
 Gebirgs-Pionier-Abteilung 95
 Gebirgs-Nachrichten-Abteilung 95
 Gebirgs-Sanitäts-Abteulung 95
 Gebirgs-Feldersatz-Bataillon 95

References

 

Mountain divisions of Germany in World War II
Military units and formations established in 1940
Crete in World War II
Airborne divisions of Germany in World War II
Military units and formations disestablished in 1945